Colchero is a surname. Notable people with the surname include:

Ana Colchero (born 1968), Mexican actress and economist
Arantxa Colchero, Mexican economist